Inangahua is a small settlement in the northwest of New Zealand's South Island. Murchison is  further east. After the 1968 Inangahua Earthquake, most of the inhabitants left the area or shifted to the township, which is now the population centre and known simply as Inangahua.

Inangahua's main industries include forestry, coal, farming and sawmilling. There is a small primary school, shops, fire station and earthquake museum. The population of Inangahua and its surrounds was 144 in the 2013 census, a decrease of 15 people from 2006.

Name 
The name of the town refers to inanga, the Māori word for whitebait (Galaxias spp.) and hua, the act of drying and preserving them in sealed containers; the river was known for its abundance of fish. Inangahua Junction was formerly known as Christies Junction.

Inangahua Landing 

Before the construction of the Buller Gorge road, the only way to travel inland from Westport was by river. At the beginning of the West Coast gold rush, mining equipment and quartz-crushing machinery was ferried up the Buller River to its confluence with the Inangahua, then about 10 km up the Inanghua as far as "The Landing", from which it was transported overland south to Reefton. At the height of the gold rush over 1000 prospectors were working in tributaries of the Inangahua.

Earthquake

The town was substantially affected by an earthquake on Friday, 24 May 1968. At 5:24 am, the earthquake measuring 7.1 on the Richter scale struck the town, and many landslides and aftershocks followed. The entire population of around 100 was temporarily evacuated. There were no fatalities in the town, but a woman and her visiting mother were killed when the house they were in, along the Inangahua Junction to Westport road, was crushed by a landslide on the cliffs above their house, while a man died near Greymouth when his car hit a section of road on that suddenly subsided on the run-up to a bridge. Another three died days later when a helicopter surveying downed telephone lines crashed.

Demographics

The statistical area of Inangahua, which covers 3,196 square kilometres and surrounds but does not include Reefton, had a population of 864 at the 2018 New Zealand census, a decrease of 147 people (-14.5%) since the 2013 census, and a decrease of 117 people (-11.9%) since the 2006 census. There were 402 households. There were 468 males and 396 females, giving a sex ratio of 1.18 males per female. The median age was 42.6 years (compared with 37.4 years nationally), with 162 people (18.8%) aged under 15 years, 150 (17.4%) aged 15 to 29, 426 (49.3%) aged 30 to 64, and 123 (14.2%) aged 65 or older.

Ethnicities were 91.3% European/Pākehā, 9.4% Māori, 0.7% Pacific peoples, 3.1% Asian, and 2.8% other ethnicities (totals add to more than 100% since people could identify with multiple ethnicities).

The proportion of people born overseas was 11.1%, compared with 27.1% nationally.

Although some people objected to giving their religion, 56.9% had no religion, 28.8% were Christian, 1.7% were Hindu and 1.0% had other religions.

Of those at least 15 years old, 48 (6.8%) people had a bachelor or higher degree, and 201 (28.6%) people had no formal qualifications. The median income was $29,600, compared with $31,800 nationally. The employment status of those at least 15 was that 375 (53.4%) people were employed full-time, 108 (15.4%) were part-time, and 21 (3.0%) were unemployed.

Railways
Inangahua Junction is located on the Stillwater - Westport Line railway, and was intended to be the junction of this line with the never-completed Nelson Section. In 1914, the railway was opened to Inangahua Junction from its former terminus in Cronadun, but subsequent progress through the Buller Gorge was slow. In July 1942, trains began running the full length of the line between Stillwater and Westport, but the line was not officially opened until 5 December 1943. With the commencement of through services, passenger trains were operated by RM class Vulcan railcars, which connected in Stillwater with services that ran along the Midland Line between Greymouth and Christchurch. In 1967, the passenger services ceased, and today, the primary traffic is coal, with multiple coal trains passing through Inangahua Junction daily. Today the town is served by the daily inter city bus between Nelson and Westport.

PHAT Music Festival
Inangaha was the host of the PHAT New Year's Eve music festivals. PHAT07, PHAT08, PHAT09, PHAT10 (with Australian band Pendulum and NZers Black Seeds, Kora, Salmonella Dub, Tiki and Concord Dawn), PHAT11 featured New Zealand and many international acts. PHAT is held on flat clearings surrounded by native bush on Rough Creek Road, off Browns Creek Road, south of Inangahua and owned by the Storer family. Approximately 5000 people attend the PHAT music festivals, with 48+ hours of continuous performance on two stages.

The other annual event held on the Inangahua site was PHAT MOON, a slightly smaller version of the bigger New Year's Eve's event. 
PHAT MOON was held over Easter weekend. The music runs for 24 hours, but people are invited to come and camp the night before.
This ceased quite a few years ago; the site has returned to being a farm.

Education
Inangahua Junction School was a coeducational contributing primary (years 1–6) school. The school was in existence in 1887. It closed in 2018.

Inangahua College merged with Reefton School to form Reefton Area School in 2004. The College, which existed for 38 years, replaced the Reefton District High School.

References

External links
 
 Map of Inangahua area

Buller District
Populated places in the West Coast, New Zealand